Talking Voice vs. Singing Voice is an album by the band Starflyer 59, released in 2005.

Its sound is very different from the band's early work, which was characterized by loud guitars and a "wall of sound." The album includes string arrangements on several tracks and a trumpet on the song "Easy Street." Most of the album has a relaxed attitude, except for the song "Good Sons," which has an upbeat, dance-like sound.

Critical reception
Exclaim! wrote: "Making above average, semplice rock for 12 years, Starflyer 59 haven't really changed much." Paste wrote that "the vocal monotony truly is a shame because [Jason] Martin’s compositions are often warmly seductive."

Track listing

Personnel
Jason Martin – guitar, singing
Frank Lenz – drum kit, string arrangements
Nicole Garcia – violin
Briana Dandy – viola
Ginger Murphy – cello
Dirk Lemmenes – bass guitar
Matt Fronke – trumpet

References

2005 albums
Starflyer 59 albums
Tooth & Nail Records albums